Heorhiy Narbut (in Narbutivka — 23 May 1920 in Kyiv) was the most important Ukrainian graphic designer of the twentieth century.

He is known for designing the Ukrainian National Republic's coat of arms, banknotes, postage stamps, charters, and for his many illustrations in books and magazines. He is also known as Georgy Narbut and George Narbut. He was a brother of a noted Acmeist poet Vladimir Narbut.

Biography 
Heorhiy Narbut was born in the village Narbutivka, Russian Empire (now Ukraine) not far off from Hlukhiv. His family had origins of ancient Lithuanian nobility. His first painting education was self-taught.

Saint Petersburg 
At about age 20, Narbut settled in Saint Petersburg from 1906 to 1917. There he studied with painters Ivan Bilibin and Mstislav Dobuzhinsky. In 1909, Narbut continued some of his studies in Munich, in the school of Simon Hollósy. After his return to Saint Petersburg he joined the organization Mir iskusstva. In 1910-1912 Narbut was an illustrator of the fairy tales Hans Christian Andersen, the fables of Ivan Krylov, and folk tales.

Kyiv 
In March 1917, Narbut moved to Kyiv. In September 1917, he became professor and rector of the Ukrainian Academy of Arts. During this time he created his Ukrainian banknotes, postage stamps and charters for the newly created Ukrainian National Republic. Narbut also worked on the Ukrainian magazines: Nashe Mynule (Our past), Zori (Stars), and Sontse Truda (The Sun of Labor) among others. He died of typhus in 1920.

The dancer Marina Berezowsky (1914-2011) was his daughter.  She became a major figure in ballet in Australia.

Works
Armorial of Little Russia

References

External links 
100 famous names of Ukraine - UKROP Encyclopedia , Accessed 23 June 2008
Narbut`s works in Grynyov Art Foundation Collection
Heorhiy Narbut: founder of the Ukrainian graphics
Heorhiy Narbut. Album. Kyiv,1983
Heorhiy Narbut in Kharkiv Art Museum collection. Kharkiv, 1973.

1886 births
1920 deaths
People from Sumy Oblast
People from Glukhovsky Uyezd
Ukrainian illustrators
Ukrainian heraldic artists
Russian artists
Ukrainian stamp designers
Ukrainian people of Lithuanian descent
Ukrainian graphic designers
Academic staff of the National Academy of Visual Arts and Architecture
Ukrainian people of Polish descent
Russian people of Polish descent
Deaths from typhus